The 87th Indianapolis 500 was held at the Indianapolis Motor Speedway in Speedway, Indiana on Sunday, May 25, 2003. Two-time defending champion Hélio Castroneves won the pole position and was trying to become the first driver in Indy history to win three in a row. With 31 laps to go, however, Castroneves was passed by his Penske teammate Gil de Ferran, and the duo finished 1st–2nd, with de Ferran winning his first Indy 500. The race was sanctioned by the Indy Racing League and was part of the 2003 IndyCar Series season.

For the 2003 season, the series adopted a new chassis package and saw the introduction of Toyota and Honda to the field. It was Honda's third period of involvement at Indy. They partnered with the Judd program in the 1987 race, and was an engine provider in CART in 1990s, entering at Indy in 1994-1995. Toyota, previously an engine provider in CART, however, was making their first ever trip to Indy.

Due to cost issues, and a shortage of engines and drivers, there was considerable concern going into the event that the field might fall short of the traditional 33 starters. On the final day of qualifying, the field was filled, avoiding a PR "black eye."

Former presidents George H. W. Bush and Bill Clinton were in attendance, the first time in Indy history that two former presidents were at the race. It was the elder Bush's second visit to the Speedway; he previously presided over the opening ceremonies of the 1987 Pan American Games, which was held at the track. Rookie A. J. Foyt IV, racing on his 19th birthday, became the youngest driver ever to compete in the race.

For the first time since the 1970s, the race was not announced as a sell out. Since 1985, the race was usually sold out by July of the previous year.

As of 2020, the 2003 race was the first and only Indy 500 victory for Toyota. It also marked the first Indy 500 win for a Japanese and/or Asian engine manufacturer.

Background

The biggest interest story going into the race was the impending retirement of popular veteran Michael Andretti.  Andretti announced that the 2003 Indy 500 would be his final race, and that he would retire from driving immediately after, to focus on team ownership. (Note that Andretti came out of retirement and returned to drive at Indy in 2006-2007.)

Despite the open wheel "split" continuing into what was now its eighth season, nearly all of the top CART-based teams entered at Indy for 2003. It was the fourth consecutive year that CART-based teams entered the Indy 500, and each successive year saw an increased number of participants "crossing over." The 2003 season was a turning point in the "split," as several teams, including Penske, Andretti-Green, Ganassi, and Rahal pulled out of CART and defected permanently to the Indy Racing League on a full-time bases. One of the few holdouts for 2003 was Newman/Haas Racing. Paul Tracy, a key fixture in the controversial 2002 race, also did not enter.

During the spring Dario Franchitti of Andretti-Green Racing was injured in a motorcycle accident, which sidelined him for most of the season. Robby Gordon replaced him in the car at Indy, and Gordon planned to attempt the Indy-Charlotte "Double Duty."

After changes in the rules, Greg Ray entered and qualified a car carrying the number 13. It was the first time #13 appeared on a car at the Indy 500 since George Mason in 1914. From 1926 to 2002, usage of #13 was not permitted, and throughout the entire history of the race, was generally avoided by competitors due to superstitions.

For the first time ever, a support race was scheduled for the month of May at Indy. The Menards Infiniti Pro Series arrived at the Speedway for the inaugural Freedom 100. The race was scheduled for the Saturday of Bump Day weekend.

Mario Andretti crash
Andretti-Green Racing driver, Tony Kanaan, suffered a radial fracture of his arm on April 15 in a crash at Motegi. On April 23, the 1969 Indianapolis 500 winner Mario Andretti took over Kanaan's car for a test session. Andretti retired in 1994, and this was the first time in nine years he had driven a major open wheel car. If Kanaan was not cleared to drive in enough time, tentative plans were being prepared for Andretti to qualify the car for him. He would then turn the car over to Kanaan on race day. No firm plans had yet been made though for Andretti to actually drive in the race.

During Andretti's test session, it was noted by many observers that despite his lack of experience in modern Indy cars (which had changed substantially since his retirement in 1994) and his advanced age (63), he quickly reached competitive speed. During the morning session, he turned a lap of 212.509 mph, and looked "as if he had never been away." Later in the day, he upped his speed to over 223 mph. The success of the test created a stir, and speculation grew during the afternoon that Andretti may even attempt to qualify for the race.

With only two minutes left in the session, Kenny Bräck crashed in turn one, and the yellow light came on. Andretti entered turn one at full speed, and struck debris on the track from Bräck's crash. The object, identified by some as the rear wing, or possibly a piece of foam from the impacted SAFER Barrier, pitched the nose of Andretti's car upward, and the car became airborne. The car then went into a rapid double-reverse somersault flip at speeds exceeding 200 miles per hour. Television footage from the WTHR helicopter-cam showed that the car clipped the top of the debris fence, and was nearly high enough to go over it. The car fell back to the racing surface, slowed by its mid-air tumble, and slid to a stop upright. Andretti walked away from the crash with very minor injuries.

Andretti initially shrugged off the accident, and still contemplated returning to qualify the car in May. A day later, however, he reconsidered.

Race schedule

Practice and time trials

Practice – week 1
Practice opened on Sunday May 4, with roughly 29 car/driver combinations named to the field. That was short of the traditional 33 starters for the race, and there was ongoing speculation around the garage area on who would potentially fill the four open spots. At the onset, drivers were flirting with the 230 mph barrier.

On Tuesday May 6, rookie Dan Wheldon (231.108 mph) became the first driver to break the 230 mph barrier. A day later, Kenny Brack (231.039 mph) also broke 231 mph. Dan Wheldon set the fastest lap of the month on Thursday May 8 at 232.202 mph, the fastest lap run at the Speedway since 1996.

On "Fast Friday" May 9, Arie Luyendyk spun exiting turn one, and hit the outside wall with the back end of the car. The car slid down the track, and hit the outside wall in turn 2 also. Luyendyk suffered a back injury, and soreness in his neck and shoulders. Ultimately, Luyendyk decided to sit out the race, and retired from driving permanently.

Time trials – Pole Day
Pole Day was scheduled for Saturday May 10. During the morning practice session Billy Boat spun out of turn four, and made heavy contact with the safety attenuator at the north end of the pit wall. The car hit with the back end, flew up into the air momentarily, and came to rest against the outside wall on the mainstretch. The energy-absorbing barrier was demolished, but officials stated that the barrier withstood the impact, and worked effectively. Boat was transferred to Methodist Hospital for observation, but was eventually released and cleared to drive. By the time that track crews could replace the barrier, rain began to fall. A violent thunderstorm swept through the area, and washed out qualifying for the afternoon.

Pole qualifying was moved to Sunday May 11. The weather was cool and windy. Robbie Buhl was the first car to make an attempt, and he put his car the field with a safe run of 224.369 mph. At 12:30 p.m., rookie Scott Dixon (230.099 mph) was the first car over 230 mph. At 12:45 p.m., Robby Gordon (230.205 mph) took over the provisional pole position.

At 12:55 p.m., rookie A. J. Foyt IV was attempting to become the youngest driver ever to qualify for the Indy 500. On his first lap, he spun exiting turn 2, did not hit the wall, and slid backwards down nearly the entire length of the backstretch. He was uninjured.

The first trip through the qualifying line was completed at about 1:45 p.m. Several drivers had pulled out of line, waiting for better conditions. At 2:41 p.m., Tony Kanaan took over the top spot with a run of 231.006 mph.

At 4:36 p.m., two-time defending race winner Hélio Castroneves (231.725 mph) secured the pole position. Tony Kanaan was bumped to the middle of the front row, and Robby Gordon held on to the outside of the front row. The day ended with A. J. Foyt IV completing a run, and Gil de Ferran, the last car with a realistic shot of the front row, turning in a somewhat-disappointing 228.633 mph, good enough only for 10th starting position.

Practice – week 2
Practice resumed on Wednesday May 14. With nine spots open in the field, unqualified teams began to prepare for the final day of qualifying. Alex Barron was named to replace Arie Luyendyk in the Mo Nunn entry. By Thursday, 32 car/driver combinations had materialized.

Among the fastest drivers who had yet to qualify were Jimmy Vasser (228.275 mph) and Alex Barron (227.714 mph). Vasser missed the first weekend of time trials due to his participation in the Champ Car German 500.

Time trials – Bump Day
The final day of time trials, Sunday, May 18, opened with nine spots open in the field. During the week, there was considerable concern about the prospects of filling the field to the traditional 33 starters. Airton Daré and Vítor Meira were named to rides in the morning, meaning there were then nine cars preparing to qualify.

Time trials opened at 12:30 p.m., with Jimmy Kite the first car out. After two fast laps, however, the car stalled with an electrical problem. In the first half-hour, three cars qualified, led by Jimmy Vasser, and the field was up to 27 cars.

Jimmy Kite returned to the track, this time qualifying without incident. Airton Daré stalled several times trying to leave the pits, but after repairs, he qualified to fill the field to 29 cars. Just before 2 p.m., Alex Barron and Richie Hearn completed runs, and the field was up to 31 cars. Hearn's team acquired a Penske back-up car, and he was safely in the field.

At 3 p.m., there were two spots left in the field. Only two cars remained on the sidelines, Robby McGehee and Vítor Meira. No other teams were planning on qualifying, although a rumor circulated around the garage area that Ganassi was considering on wheeling out a backup car for Jeff Ward. McGehee (224.493 mph) completed his qualifying attempt at 3:30 p.m., leaving only one spot open in the grid. At 4:05 p.m., Meira (227.158 mph) filled the field to 33 cars. At that point, the track was opened for practice, and the track officially closed at 6 o'clock without any other qualifiers.

The series avoided the embarrassment of not filling the field to the traditional 33 cars. The race had not failed to do so since 1947, when several drivers that were members of ASPAR (the American Society of Professional Auto Racing) threatened to boycott the race over the purse size. Nonetheless, some members of the media chastised the effort, later nicknaming the afternoon "Fill Day" rather than the traditional Bump Day. During the television coverage, Bob Jenkins and Jack Arute passionately defended the event from its detractors. Despite pointing out the lack of drama on the final day of time trials, Robin Miller was among those who suggested that the 2003 field was the deepest talent-wise since the open wheel "split".

Starting grid

Failed to qualify
  Scott Mayer (R) (#18) – Failed rookie orientation (replaced by Jimmy Kite)
  Arie Luyendyk (W) (#20) - Injured in practice crash (Replaced by Alex Barron)

Race summary

Start
The controversy of filling the field the previous weekend fizzled as race day arrived. Mari Hulman George gave the command to start engines at 10:47 a.m. EST, and all 33 cars pulled away from the starting grid. It would be the final time that the race would begin at the traditional 11 a.m. EST start time.

Polesitter Hélio Castroneves took the lead at the start, and led for the first 16 laps. The first yellow came out on lap 9 when Billy Boat stalled in turn two. After the restart on lap 15, Sarah Fisher spun in turn three, hitting the outside wall. After pit stops, Scott Dixon took the lead on lap 17.

First half
Michael Andretti led 28 laps in the first half, but during a pit stop on lap 98, the car quit with the broken throttle linkage.

On lap 61, Richie Hearn got up in the "marbles" in turn two, hitting the outside wall. Jaques Lazier spun to avoid the crash and came to rest on the inside of the track. Both drivers were uninjured.

The lead changed several times in the first half, with Tomas Scheckter, Tony Kanaan, and Jimmy Vasser each taking turns in the lead. Hélio Castroneves and Gil de Ferran were running in the top 5 most of the way.

Second half
Tomas Scheckter led from laps 101-128, with Hélio Castroneves close behind in second. On lap 127, Airton Dare crashed in turn 2, bringing out the caution, and the leaders all made pit stops. Castroneves beat Scheckter out of the pits and took the lead. Gil de Ferran was in third. On lap 135 restart, de Ferran passed Scheckter for second place.

At lap 150, Penske teammates Castroneves and Gil de Ferran were still running 1st-2nd. Castroneves was looking to put himself in position to win his third "500" in a row. The leaders made their final pit stops on laps 165-168. After the sequence of green flag stops, Castroneves and de Ferran were again running 1st-2nd.

On lap 169, leader Castroneves was hung up behind the lapped car of A. J. Foyt IV down the backstretch. While it was not captured by TV cameras, earlier in the race A. J. Foyt IV had come down and made contact with Castroneves while being lapped in Turn 2. This perhaps led to Castroneves following A. J. Foyt IV through the 2nd turn allowing de Ferran to make the pass for the lead going into turn 3.
 
On lap 172, Robby Gordon stopped on the track with a broken gearbox. The yellow came out, but none of the leaders pitted. Gordon immediately departed the grounds, and flew to Charlotte for the Coca-Cola 600.

With 25 laps to go, the green came back out with de Ferran leading, and Castroneves in second.

Finish
On lap 182, Scott Sharp brushed the wall in turn 4, then crashed in turn 1. After the cleanup, the green came back out on lap 186. One lap later, however, Dan Wheldon spun in turn three, hit the outside wall, then the car flipped over and landed upside-down. Wheldon was not injured.

During the caution for the Wheldon crash, Scott Dixon, who was running in the top ten, was weaving back and forth on the mainstretch to warm up his tires. He began to do it too vigorously, and brushed the inside wall. The car was too damaged to continue.

The green came out with six laps to go. Gil de Ferran held off Hélio Castroneves by 0.2290 seconds to win his first Indianapolis 500. After the race, Castroneves coaxed de Ferran to climb the catch fence on the mainstretch, mimicking his own traditional post-race victory celebration. de Ferran ended up retiring at season's end, becoming the fourth Indy 500 winner to retire as a reigning "500" champion.

The "curse of the Indy three-peat" prevailed again as Castroneves failed to achieve victory. His three-race career record of 1st-1st-2nd, however, established an Indy record for a driver's first three starts. Castroneves' second place tied Al Unser's 1970-1971-1972 effort of 1st-1st-2nd.

Box score

 = Former Indianapolis 500 winner;  = Indianapolis 500 rookie

*C Chassis: D=Dallara, P=Panoz

*E Engine: C=Chevrolet, H=Honda, T=Toyota

All cars in the 2003 Indianapolis 500 used Firestone tires.
This was the first of three Indianapolis 500s for Toyota, and their only win in the race.

Broadcasting

Radio
The race was carried live on the Indy Racing Radio Network. Mike King served as chief announcer. The booth crew had a new look for 2003. Longtime driver expert Johnny Rutherford left the crew to take over the position of pace car driver during caution periods. Joining King in the booth were two newcomers, Dave Wilson who served as color commentator, and new "driver expert" Davey Hamilton. Hamilton was on a hiatus from driving after his serious crash at Texas in 2001. The broadcast was heard on 555 affiliates.

The 2003 race saw all four turn reporters return to their assigned posts from the previous year. The three pit reporters remained the same, although they swapped their locations along pit road. The 2003 race would be the final 500 on the radio for longtime members Howdy Bell and Chuck Marlowe. Bell once again had the limited role of reporting from the track hospital, while Marlowe covered the garage area as he had since 1989.

Sponsor guests interviewed in the booth included Tim Manganello (BorgWarner), Keith Sirios (Checkers and Rally's), and Chevrolet pace car driver Herb Fishel. Other guests interviewed in the pits included Jim Campbell (Chevrolet) and Wynonna Judd.

Television
The race was carried live flag-to-flag coverage in the United States on ABC Sports. The on-air crew remained the same from the previous year, with Bob Jenkins returning as host, and Paul Page handling the play-by-play duties. It would ultimately be the final 500 on television for Bob Jenkins.

For the first time, the race broadcast featured a presenting sponsor. The race was billed as the "Indianapolis 500 Presented by 7-Eleven." The crew called the race for the final time from the booth on top of the Paddock grandstand, for starting in 2004, they would move to the newer television studio inside the Pagoda.

Controversy
On Sunday May 18, the final day of time trials, when there was some question of whether the field would be filled to the traditional 33 cars, television reporters Bob Jenkins and Jack Arute passionately defended the event from its detractors on air. Afterwards, Jenkins received criticism, mostly for a lack of journalistic professionalism and objectivity. His statements were considered biased in favor of the IRL/IMS, and that he allowed his personal opinions enter his reporting.

During ABC coverage of time trials, Vítor Meira filled the field to 33 cars. Arute opened his interview with Meira at 5:17 p.m. EDT by stating:

A minute later, Jenkins replied with:

As the day was coming to a close, the television coverage switched to ESPN for the final hour. Jenkins closed the broadcast with the following commentary at 6:56 p.m. EDT:

A minute later, Arute followed:

Jenkins was released from ABC/ESPN at the end of the 2003 season. After a very brief stint covering CART on Spike TV in 2004, and after a single race at ESPN in 2008, he joined Versus (now known as the NBC Sports Network) in 2009. It was never announced if the on-air comments were a factor in his release, and Jenkins contends he was never informed if that was the case. Following the 2012 season, Jenkins reduced his schedule to a reserve role that includes Carb Day coverage.

Notes

References

Works cited
2003 Indianapolis 500 Daily Trackside Report for the Media
Indianapolis 500 History: Race & All-Time Stats – Official Site

Indianapolis 500 races
2003 in IndyCar
Indianapolis 500
Indianapolis 500
Indianapolis 500